Prophecy of the Shadow is a 1992 fantasy role-playing video game developed by Strategic Simulations for MS-DOS. The game was released in both English and German versions.

Plot
In Prophecy of the Shadow, the land is slowly dying, and it is the player's mission to find out why. The player's character is a disciple of Larkin of Bannerwick. When the player's master is murdered, the player is blamed for his death. The player has magical powers, but the king has outlawed all magic.

Gameplay
The game plays from an isometric top-down viewpoint, similar to a contemporary game of the time, Ultima VII: The Black Gate. The player character has three statistics: Health, Magic, and Agility. Health reflects the character's stamina, life, and strength. Magic is the amount of power the player possesses to conjure spells. Agility is the ability to dodge an enemy's blows. The game uses an overhead perspective, with icons to the left of the screen which allow the character to drop, use, or give items, attack or talk to others, and enter buildings.

Reception
The New Straits Times in 1992 called Prophecy of the Shadow the game that Richard Garriott would have produced were he an SSI employee. It wrote that "Gameplay could not be better", citing the user interface, large world to explore, and use of humor. The newspaper concluded "I can wholeheartedly say, 'Good show, old chaps! Just don't give us any more recycled trash like Dark Queen of Krynn." QuestBusters called the game "a significant improvement over [SSI's] Gold Box series — and a lot of fun to play". It liked the "beautiful digitized graphics and over 50 sound effects", and user interface, and concluded that the game was "just plain fun". The game was reviewed in 1993 in Dragon #189 by Hartley, Patricia, and Kirk Lesser in "The Role of Computers" column. The reviewers gave the game 3 out of 5 stars. Computer Gaming World called Prophecy of the Shadow "a refreshingly enjoyable adventure, targeted primarily at role-playing neophytes". The magazine stated that "the quality of the digitized animation is surprisingly good", and recommended the game both to new adventure gamers and those "looking for something new and refreshing". It received a 4 out of 5 review in Datormagazin Vol 1992 No 14 (Aug 1992), reviewed by Göran Fröjdh.

Reviews
ASM (Aktueller Software Markt) - Aug, 1992

References

External links

Prophecy of the Shadow at GameSpot
Prophecy of the Shadow at GameFAQs

1992 video games
DOS games
DOS-only games
Fantasy video games
Role-playing video games
Strategic Simulations games
Video games developed in the United States
Video games featuring protagonists of selectable gender